Kordia is a Gram-negative, strictly aerobic and non-motile genus of bacteria from the family of Flavobacteriaceae.

References

Flavobacteria
Bacteria genera
Taxa described in 2004